The Sanremo Music Festival 1978 was the 28th annual Sanremo Music Festival, held at the Teatro Ariston in Sanremo, province of Imperia between 26 and 28 January 1978. The final night was broadcast by Rai 1, while the first two nights were broadcast live only by radio.

The show was presented by  Stefania Casini, Beppe Grillo, Maria Giovanna Elmi and Vittorio Salvetti (who also served as artistic director).
  
The winners of the Festival were Matia Bazar with the song "E dirsi ciao".

Participants and results

References 

Sanremo Music Festival by year
1978 in Italian music
1978 music festivals